is a 1995 puzzle video game developed by Nacoty and published by J-Wing in Japan for the Virtual Boy. Its gameplay is reminiscent of Pipe Dream and the Game Boy title Chiki Chiki Tengoku, and involves the player moving worm pieces of different shapes that descend onto the playing field by linking or shutting their open orifices together to make them disappear and gain points across multiple levels.

First announced under the working title Chiki Chiki Labo, Virtual Lab was created by a developer only known by the pseudonym of Megumi, who operated under the Nacoty label when working on the project. The game was reportedly launched by J-Wing in a unfinished state to recoup investment after they discovered Nintendo was planning to discontinue the platform under a very limited run of copies. It is considered by gaming journalists as one of the rarest, most valuable and sought-after Virtual Boy titles.

Virtual Lab received mostly negative reception from critics since its release; criticism was geared towards its presentation, poor use of the Virtual Boy's stereoscopic 3D effects, high difficulty and lack of replay value, while some felt divided regarding its gameplay but the soundtrack was commended. Retrospective commentary have been equally negative, with some considering it one of the worst games for the platform, being panned for its unfinished state as well as the lack of depth, controls, frustrating gameplay and repetitiveness.

Gameplay 

Virtual Lab is a falling-tile puzzle game reminiscent of Pipe Dream and the Game Boy title Chiki Chiki Tengoku. During gameplay, the player must clear worm pieces of different shapes that descend onto the playing field by linking or shutting their open orifices together to make them disappear and gain points in order to progress into the next level. There are 100 levels in total, with last one being a endless loop, while the player can also adjust the game's speed at the title screen, ranging from "Low" to "Mid" to "Hi", but "Mid" is the fastest.

The main objective across every level is to make a determined number of linked worm pieces. The player can also use the bottom and side edges of the playfield to make linked worm pieces disappear. If the worms pieces are linked in a certain way, a fairy will spawn to clear the bottom pieces in the playfield. The game is over once any stack of worm pieces reaches the top of the playfield. The game gives a password after completing each level, but there is no dedicated screen to input them, rendering the passwords completely useless.

Development and release 

Virtual Lab was created by a developer only known by the pseudonym of Megumi, who operated under the label "Nacoty" when working on the project. According to Megumi, the 13-year-old girl who appears in the game's HUD is both a self-portrait and an expression of the gender dysphoria she felt as a transgender woman. Megumi stated that the character was not envisioned as a teenager when she was designed, and that she was shocked to see the game's manual describe her as such.

Virtual Lab was first announced at E3 1995 under the working title Chiki Chiki Labo. The game was first showcased to the video game press and attendees at the 1995 Consumer Soft Group (CSG) trade show and later at Shoshinkai 1995. The title was originally slated for a December 22, 1995 release by J-Wing in Japan, but was published on December 8 instead and was housed in an eight megabit cartridge. Due to being one of the last releases for Virtual Boy in Japan, coupled with rumors of J-Wing publishing it in a unfinished state to recoup investment after discovering Nintendo was planning to discontinue the platform under a very limited run of copies, makes the game harder to find and more expensive than earlier releases, becoming a rare collector's item that commands high prices on the secondary game collecting market.

Megumi would leave the gaming industry shortly after the game's release. According to her, the decision was made after being sexually assaulted while moonlighting at a snack bar for transgender people.

Reception 

Virtual Lab garnered mostly negative reception from critics since its release. Famitsus four reviewers criticized the game for its "cheap" presentation, poor stereoscopic 3D effects, high difficulty and lack of replay value. They also stated that its gameplay was more fitting for other platforms. The Japanese book Virtual Boy Memorial Commemorative Guidebook gave it the lowest rating in the publication, regarding it as a very strange title due to its gameplay premise, and found the 3D effect of the girl's breasts to be "unnatural". In contrast to the other publicacions, a writer for British magazine Retrogames was more positive towards the game, noting its gameplay to be addictive and "catchy" soundtrack, but criticized its poor use of the hardware's capabilities.

Retrospective commentary for Virtual Lab have been equally negative, with some considering it one of the worst games for the platform. Nintendo Lifes Dave Frear wrote that the game had potential with some polish and refinement, but criticized it for being unfinished as well as its lack of depth, "buggy" controls, dull and frustrating gameplay, and repetitiveness. Retro Gamer also criticized the title for being unfinished and having "very little" content, commenting that it was good as a collector's item for enthusiasts of the Virtual Boy. Concurring with Frear, Retronauts writer Jeremy Parish found its gameplay frustrating and the controls occasionally unresponsive as well. Parish agreed that the game could have been a good puzzle title for the system with more effort placed into correcting its flaws and improving it. He ultimately deemed it one of the worst Virtual Boy titles.

Notes

References

External links 

 Virtual Lab at GameFAQs
 Virtual Lab at MobyGames

1995 video games
Japan-exclusive video games
Puzzle video games
Single-player video games
Video games developed in Japan
Virtual Boy games